Bert Greene may refer to:
 Bert Greene (cookbook author)
 Bert Greene (golfer)

See also
 Albert Greene (disambiguation)
Bert Green (disambiguation)
Robert Greene (disambiguation)
Herbert Greene (disambiguation)